Knarrevik or Knarrvika is a village in Øygarden municipality in Vestland county, Norway.  It is located along the Byfjorden on the eastern coast of the island of Litlesotra, just north of the village of Straume.  The western end of the Sotra Bridge lies at Knarrevik.

Statistics Norway groups Knarrevik and neighboring Straume together as one large urban area for statistical purposes.

References

Villages in Vestland
Øygarden

nl:Knarrevik/Straume